Hermann Brügmann (2 February 1900 – 9 May 1970) was a Danish athlete. He competed in the men's long jump and the men's triple jump at the 1928 Summer Olympics.

References

External links
 

1900 births
1970 deaths
Athletes (track and field) at the 1928 Summer Olympics
Danish male long jumpers
Danish male triple jumpers
Olympic athletes of Denmark
Place of birth missing
20th-century Danish people